Patrick Martins (born 1 January 1997) is an Irish actor. He is known for his stage work and his roles in the Virgin Media One crime drama Redemption (2022) and the ITVX period drama The Confessions of Frannie Langton (2022).

Early life
Of Nigerian origin, Martins moved to Ireland when he was five where he was brought up with his three siblings by their mother Mabel in Swords, a suburb just north of Dublin in Fingal. He attended Fingal Community College. Unsure what to do during his Leaving Cert, his mother suggested he try acting. He took a two year PLC course with the Bull Alley Theatre Company at Liberties College along side his good friend Kieran Flynn. He went on to graduate with a Bachelor of Arts in Acting from The Lir Academy at Trinity College Dublin in 2019.

Career
Martins made his television debut as Zac in the RTÉ fantasy comedy Blasts from the Past. Martins received critical acclaim for his breakout stage performance as M'Closky in the 2022 Abbey Theatre production of Branden Jacobs-Jenkins' stage adaptation of An Octoroon. He also appeared in Good Sex at the Dublin Theatre Festival.

Around this time, Martins also appeared in the Virgin Media One crime drama Redemption as DS Luke Byrne. In August 2021, it was announced Martins would star as Olaudah "Laddie" Cambridge in the period drama The Confessions of Frannie Langton, an adaptation of the novel of the same name by Sara Collins. The series premiered on ITVX in December 2022.

Filmography

Stage

References

External links

 Patrick Martins at the Artists Partnership

Living people
1997 births
21st-century Irish male actors
Black Irish people
Male actors from County Dublin
Nigerian emigrants to Ireland
People from Swords, Dublin
Year of birth missing (living people)